Bumb is a surname. Notable people with the surname include:

 Ambika Bumb, American chief executive and scientist
 Dionisiu Bumb (born 1973), Romanian footballer
 Renée Marie Bumb (born 1960), American jurist

See also
 Bumb (drum), an instrument used in the music of Uttar Pradesh, India
 Bomb (disambiguation)
 Bum (disambiguation)
 Bump (disambiguation)

trap bumb: Someone who is not necessarily lazy, but no longer wants to continue and simply thinks on his, with nothing clear in his mind, and dedicated to wandering without a destiny.